UAH may refer to:

 UAH, ISO 4217 currency code of the Ukrainian hryvnia, the national currency of Ukraine
 Universidad Alejandro de Humboldt, Venezuela
 University of Alabama in Huntsville
 University of Alcalá, Spain (Universidad de Alcalá de Henares)
 Alberto Hurtado University, Chile (Universidad Alberto Hurtado)
University Academy Holbeach, a secondary school in Lincolnshire, UK